Suomi-sarja is the second tier league for bandy in Finland. The league is under Bandyliiga.

Teams
 HIFK/2
 Uleaborg IFK
 Veitera/2
 Lennex BK
 Vesta
 Kampparit/2
 Kampparit/SS
 JPS/2

See also
 List of Finnish Bandy clubs

External links
  

Bandy competitions in Finland
Sports leagues in Finland
Professional sports leagues in Finland